Kaseman Beckman Advanced Strategies (KBAS) is a design and architecture firm founded in 2002 and based in Philadelphia, Pennsylvania.
Its principals are Julie Beckman and Keith Kaseman. Among the firm's completed projects are large-scale memorials such as the Pentagon Memorial in Arlington, Virginia, and business-sized workspaces such as Studio 34: Yoga | Healing | Arts, a  yoga-and-arts studio in Philadelphia.

In 2006, KBAS was named by the Architectural League of New York as a winner of the Young Architects competition for projects in the theme Instability.

In 2011, the American Council of Engineering Companies awarded the firm their National Honor Award. That year, the Illuminating Engineering Society of North America awarded KBAS a Philament Award, and McGraw-Hill Construction selected them for Project of the Year in park/side/landscaping. That same year, the Design-Build Institute of America awarded KBAS their Design-Build Excellence Award.

In 2012, the American Institute of Architects awarded KBAS a National Medal of Service (a gold medallion) at their Architects of Healing ceremony, which honored architects involved in 9/11 memorials and rebuilding efforts.

References

External links
 
 Arch Daily photos of Pentagon Memorial construction and installation

Architecture firms based in Pennsylvania
Companies based in Philadelphia